Dipsas schunkii, Schunk's snail-eater,  is a non-venomous snake found in Peru.

References

Dipsas
Snakes of South America
Reptiles of Peru
Endemic fauna of Peru
Reptiles described in 1908
Taxa named by George Albert Boulenger